The following highways are numbered 673:

Canada
 Saskatchewan Highway 673

Philippines
 N673 highway (Philippines)

United States